UFC Fight Night: Boetsch vs. Henderson (also known as UFC Fight Night 68) was a mixed martial arts event held on June 6, 2015, at the Smoothie King Center in New Orleans, Louisiana.

Background
The event was expected to be headlined by a light heavyweight bout between top contenders Daniel Cormier and Ryan Bader. However on April 28, due to Jon Jones' hit-and-run incident leading up to his fight at UFC 187 against Anthony Johnson, the UFC decided to strip him of the UFC Light Heavyweight Championship and suspend him indefinitely. Jones was replaced by Cormier. In turn, a middleweight bout between Tim Boetsch and mixed martial arts legend Dan Henderson was promoted to the main event. Subsequently, Bader was pulled from the event entirely.

A bantamweight bout between Joe Soto and Anthony Birchak was originally expected to take place at UFC 177. However, on the day of weigh ins, Soto was pulled from the fight to replace Renan Barão in a UFC Bantamweight Championship bout against champion T.J. Dillashaw, as Barão had to be admitted to the hospital as a result of his attempts to cut weight. Birchak was removed from the card entirely. The fight was later rescheduled for this event.

Alan Jouban was expected to face Brian Ebersole at the event. However, Jouban pulled out of the fight in late March citing injury and was replaced by Omari Akhmedov.

Zubaira Tukhugov was expected to face Thiago Tavares at the event. However on April 25, it was announced that Tukhugov had to pull out of the fight due to an undisclosed injury. Brian Ortega was announced as his replacement on May 6.

Daniel Sarafian was expected to face Ricardo Abreu at this event. However on May 4, Sarafian was forced to withdraw from the event due to injury and was replaced by Jake Collier.

Both Yancy Medeiros and Leonardo Morales missed weight on their first attempts at the weigh-ins, coming in at 159.5 lb and 140 lb respectively. They were both given additional time to make the weight limits for their respective weight classes, but Medeiros made no attempts to cut further. Morales would miss weight again on his second attempt, coming in at 137 lb. As a result, they were both fined 20 percent of their fight purses, which went to Dustin Poirier and José Alberto Quiñónez respectively.

With seven first-round finishes, this event ties the record for most first-round finishes in a single UFC event.

Results

Bonus awards
The following fighters were awarded $50,000 bonuses:

Fight of the Night: Brian Ortega vs. Thiago Tavares
Performance of the Night: Dustin Poirier and Shawn Jordan

See also
List of UFC events
2015 in UFC

References

UFC Fight Night
2015 in mixed martial arts
Mixed martial arts in New Orleans
MMA
June 2015 sports events in the United States
Events in New Orleans